Karl Ernst (1 September 1904, Berlin – 30 June 1934, Berlin) was an SA-Gruppenführer who, in early 1933, was the SA leader in Berlin. Prior to joining the Nazi Party, he had been a hotel bellboy and a bouncer at a gay nightclub. He was one of the chief participants in the extrajudicial murder of Albrecht Höhler.

Reichstag fire
It has been suggested that it was he who, with a small party of stormtroopers, passed through a passage from the Palace of the President of the Reichstag, and set the Reichstag building on fire on the night of 27 February 1933. There is evidence indirectly to substantiate this: Gisevius at Nuremberg implicated Goebbels in planning the fire, Rudolph Diels stated that Göring knew how the fire was to be started, and General Franz Halder stated that he had heard Göring claim responsibility for the fire. However, according to Ian Kershaw, the consensus of nearly all historians is that Marinus van der Lubbe did set the Reichstag on fire.

Night of the Long Knives
On 30 June 1934 Ernst had just married and was in Bremen on his way to Tenerife to honeymoon with his new wife. SA Leader Ernst Röhm had repeatedly called for a "second revolution" that would introduce socialism into the Reich and banish the old Conservative forces of business and government.  Fearing the socialistic tendencies of the SA, along with Röhm's ambition to absorb the Reichswehr into the SA, conservative elements in the German Army and Kriegsmarine pressed for elimination of SA power. Adolf Hitler—who had served as Ernst's best man at his wedding six weeks earlier—undertook a purge of the SA, an event known to history as the Night of the Long Knives. It lasted until 2 July 1934.

Ernst was arrested and brutally beaten in Bremerhaven together with his wife and his friend Martin Kirschbaum as he was about to get aboard a navy cruiser in order to travel to Tenerife where he planned to spend his honeymoon. Later on, he was handed over in Bonn to an SS-commando unit led by Kurt Gildisch where he was tortured and interrogated. He was then flown back to Berlin and taken to the barracks of the Leibstandarte Adolf Hitler, where he was shot by a firing squad in the early evening of 30 June. According to the official death list drawn up for internal-administrative use by the Gestapo he was one of fourteen people shot on the grounds of the Leibstandarte.

References

1904 births
1934 deaths
20th-century Freikorps personnel
German murderers
German torture victims
Politicians from Berlin
Sturmabteilung officers
German Protestants
Victims of the Night of the Long Knives
Members of the Reichstag of the Weimar Republic
Members of the Reichstag of Nazi Germany
People from Berlin executed by Nazi Germany
People executed by Nazi Germany by firing squad
Nazis executed by Nazi Germany
Nazis executed by firing squad
Security guards